Arthur Lightening (1 August 1936 - 2001) was a South African footballer who played as a goalkeeper in the Football League for Coventry City, Middlesbrough and Nottingham Forest.

Early life

Lightening was born in Durban, South Africa on 1 August 1936. He went to Mansfield High School.

Career

Lightening played for Nottingham Forest until 1958, when he signed for Coventry City. He made his debut against Hartlepool United on 13 December of that year and went on to make over one hundred and fifty appearances for the club. He later played for Middlesbrough.

References 

South African soccer players
Coventry City F.C. players
Nottingham Forest F.C. players
Middlesbrough F.C. players
Place of birth missing
1936 births
2001 deaths
Association football goalkeepers